Tanbridge House School is a coeducational secondary school located in Horsham, West Sussex, England. Its current head master is Mr Sheridan who started in 2022.  The school teaches a variety of subjects across the curriculum. In 2012 95.7% of students achieved A*-C grades at GCSE. Of those, 79% achieved 5 A*-C including English and Maths.

In November 2012, the school achieved an 'Outstanding' Ofsted rating in all four key areas of inspection. This placed it in the top three percent of secondary schools in the country and made it one of only seven 'Outstanding' secondary schools in the county.

School Information
There is a 'Student Voice' at Tanbridge which involves over 100 student representatives, who are involved in interviewing potential staff, leading on environmental and charitable issues and helping new pupils make the transition from primary to secondary school. The school was one of the first schools in West Sussex to achieve a Rights Respecting Schools Award (UNICEF).

There are SMART boards in every classroom, nine dedicated IT suites with another five computer areas and iPads. Since 2008, the school has had a Virtual Learning Environment and Moodle. The school has its own Learning Resource Centre.

The annual school production is held every summer at The Capitol Theatre in Horsham; West Side Story (2008) Sweeney Todd (2009) Les Misérables (2010), Evita (2011), The Phantom of the Opera (2012) and Miss Saigon (2013) were all sell out shows.

Further Education
Many of the students progress to colleges across the county, with the majority going to The College of Richard Collyer in Horsham although other colleges include Northbrook College in Worthing, Central Sussex College in Crawley, Brinsbury College in Pulborough and Chichester College.

Houses
The school has three houses, which are all namesakes of famous English sportspeople. They are:

Redgrave, after Steve Redgrave
Radcliffe, after Paula Radcliffe
Wilkinson, after Jonny Wilkinson

School achievements
The school has achieved the following in recent years

Ofsted Outstanding (2012)
Rights Respecting Schools Award (UNICEF)
Eco Schools Award
Specialist Schools and Academies Trust
Healthy Schools
Specialist Science College
Specialist Maths & Computing School
Artsmark Silver

School Timeline

Notable former pupils

 Kirsten Cooke (born 1952), actress
 Devon Endersby (born 1992), first-class cricketer
 Mark Hawkins - handball player, represented Great Britain
 Jamie Hewlett - artist/cartoonist and developer of the comic strip Tank Girl, and co-creator of the band Gorillaz
 Max Sanders - Lincoln City and England youth midfielder
 Thomas Haines - (born 1998), first class cricketer for Sussex County Cricket Club
 Chris Nash - (born 1983), first class cricketer for Sussex County Cricket Club and Nottinghamshire County Cricket Club
 Dakota Schiffer - (born 1999), contestant on series 4 of RuPaul's Drag Race UK

References

External links
http://www.tanbridge-house-sch.co.uk
Tanbridge House School Worthing Road site

Community schools in West Sussex
Secondary schools in West Sussex